God's Law and Man's is a lost 1917 silent film drama direct by John H. Collins and distributed by Metro Pictures. It starred Collins's wife Viola Dana. The story comes from a novel by Paul Trent, A Wife by Purchase.

Cast
Viola Dana - Ameia
Robert Walker - Dr. Claude Drummond
Augustus Phillips - Jack Aston
Henry Hallam - Kunda Ram
Frank Currier - Major General Dennison
Marie Adell - Olive Dennison
George A. Wright - Earl of Hetherington
Floyd Buckley - Lord Charles Drummond

References

External links

1917 films
American silent feature films
Lost American films
Films based on British novels
1917 drama films
Silent American drama films
American black-and-white films
Metro Pictures films
Films directed by John H. Collins
1917 lost films
Lost drama films
1910s American films